Weser was an ocean liner built in 1867 for North German Lloyd. She was sold to Italy in 1896 and was renamed Seravalle, being scrapped in that year.

Description
She was powered by a 2-cylinder inverted steam engine driving a single screw propeller. The engine had cylinders of  diameter by  stroke, developing .

History
Weser was built as yard number 137 by Caird & Company of Greenock, Scotland for North German Lloyd. She entered service on the Bremen-Southampton-New York-Baltimore route on 1 June 1867. On 7 August 1870, she ran aground in the Solent at the entrance to the Southampton Water. She was on a voyage from Bremen to New York, United States. She was refloated with assistance from the paddle tug Camel. In 1881, her engine was compounded. On 13 June 1895, she was transferred to the Bremen-South America service for two roundtrip voyages. She was sold to an Italian company in June 1896. She was renamed Seravalle. The ship was scrapped in August 1896 in Genoa, Italy.

References 

 Bonsor, N.R.P. North Atlantic Seaway (Vol. 2)
 Smith, Eugene W. Passenger Ships of the World Past & Present
 Hansen, Clas Broder Passenger liners from Germany, 1816-1990
 Drechsel, Edwin Norddeutscher Lloyd Bremen, 1857-1970; History, Fleet, Ship Mails (Vol. 1)

 

1867 ships
Ships built on the River Clyde
Merchant ships of the Hanseatic League
Merchant ships of the German Empire
Steamships of the German Empire
Maritime incidents in August 1871
Merchant ships of Italy
Steamships of Italy